Adesmus diana is a species of beetle in the family Cerambycidae. It was described by Thomson in 1860. It is known from Brazil, Colombia, and French Guiana.

References

Adesmus
Beetles described in 1860